Pachyarthra is a genus of moths belonging to the family Tineidae.

Species
Pachyarthra asiatica Petersen, 1959
Pachyarthra brandti Petersen, 1966
Pachyarthra grisea Petersen & Gaedike, 1982
Pachyarthra iranica Petersen & Gaedike, 1984
Pachyarthra lividella (Chrétien, 1915)
Pachyarthra mediterraneae (Bethune-Baker, 1894) (=Pachyarthra pallidella (Lucas, 1933), Pachyarthra serotinella (Chrétien, 1915), Pachyarthra variegata (Bethune-Baker, 1894))
Pachyarthra ochroplicella (Chrétien, 1915) (=Pachyarthra intermedia (Turati, 1930), Pachyarthra pentatma (Meyrick, 1936))

References

Myrmecozelinae